Jiuguang is a Chinese department store chain, a joint venture between Chongguang Department Store and Jiubai Group of Shanghai.  

Chongguang Department Store is operated by the Lifestyle International Group, which continues Sogo's operations in Hong Kong after Sogo's bankruptcy,

Jiuguang opened its flagship store in Shanghai's Jing'an District in 2004, and branch stores in Suzhou Industrial Park in 2008 and in Dalian in 2009.

References

External links
 Jiuguang Department Store website 
 Chongguang (Shanghai) 
 Jiubai Group 

Department stores of China
2004 establishments in China
Companies based in Shanghai
Retail companies of China
Shops in Shanghai
Suzhou Industrial Park
Dalian